Gibraltar competed at the 2022 European Athletics Championships in Munich, Germany, from 15–21 August 2022.

Results

The following two athletes were selected to compete by the Gibraltar Amateur Athletic Association:

See also
Gibraltar at the 2022 European Championships

References

Nations at the 2022 European Athletics Championships
2022
European Athletics Championships